Emblemariopsis arawak, the Araw glass blenny, is a species of chaenopsid blenny known from tropical reefs in the Caribbean Sea. This species can reach a length of  SL.

Etymology 
The species epithet refers to the Arawak people of the Antilles.

References
 Victor, B.C., 2010. Emblemariopsis carib and Emblemariopsis arawak, two new chaenopsid blennies from the Caribbean Sea: DNA barcoding identifies males, females, and juveniles and distinguishes sympatric cryptic species. Journal of the Ocean Science Foundation 4:1-30.

arawak
Fish described in 2010